Keith MacWhorter (born December 30, 1955) is an American former professional baseball player. The right-handed pitcher appeared in Major League Baseball for the Boston Red Sox during the 1980 season.
 
MacWhorter posted an 0–3 record with a 5.53 ERA in 14 appearances, including two starts, five games finisheds, 21 strikeouts, 18 walks, 46 hits allowed, in 42⅓ innings of work. He also pitched in the minor league systems of the Dodgers (1976), Red Sox (1978–83) and Indians (1984). In an eight-season career, he went 48–56 with 570 strikeouts and a 3.86 ERA in 861 innings.

See also
1980 Boston Red Sox season

External links
, or Retrosheet, or Pura Pelota (Venezuelan Winter League)

1955 births
Living people
Baseball players from Worcester, Massachusetts
Boston Red Sox players
Bristol Red Sox players
Bryant Bulldogs baseball players
Danville Dodgers players
Maine Guides players
Major League Baseball pitchers
Navegantes del Magallanes players
American expatriate baseball players in Venezuela
Pawtucket Red Sox players
Winter Haven Red Sox players